Fajr Aviation & Composites Industry (FACI) was established 1991 by Raht-Aseman. FACI's first design, the Fajr F.3, entered production in 2001 and made its public debut in October 2002. Production was continuing in 2006, now of the improved Fajr F.3B.

In 2010, Fajr unveiled a one-an twin-engine airplane dubbed "Faez." According to released data, it has an empty weight of 78 kilograms and a gross weight of 175 kilograms, and is intended for reconnaissance, medical supplies, and small packages.

Design and manufacturing 
Manufacturing Fajr F.3 training aircraft
Wind tunnel vanes
Hovercraft
Full composite boat
Automobile bumper
Aerodynamic fairing of helicopter
Radar and communication dishes

See also
Iran Aviation Industries Organization

References

External links

https://web.archive.org/web/20110611035220/http://www.tco.ac.ir/fajr/
https://web.archive.org/web/20070915162709/http://www.raht-air.com/
http://www.janes.com/extracts/extract/jawa/jawa5333.html
http://www.airframer.com/direct_detail.html?company=109953

Aircraft manufacturers of Iran
Manufacturing companies based in Tehran